Cork Athletic Football Club was a former Irish football club based in Cork. They played in the League of Ireland between 1948 and 1957. They were the successor club of Cork United. When United quit the league in October 1948, Cork Athletic was immediately formed to take their place. Athletic won the league in 1950 and only lost the cup final against Transport after two replays. The following year they won a league and FAI Cup double after beating Shelbourne in a replay to win the cup. In 1953 they won the first all-Cork FAI Cup final, beating Evergreen United 2–1. Athletic also began the Cork tradition of fielding veteran English League players by recruiting Sunderland legend Raich Carter. The club eventually folded in 1957, due to financial problems. They were replaced in the League by Cork Hibernians.

Honours
League of Ireland: 2
1949–50, 1950–51
FAI Cup: 2
1950–51, 1952–53
Munster Senior Cup: 3
1950–51, 1952–53, 1954–55

Season placings

Notable former players

Ireland (FAI) internationals
  Florrie Burke
  Noel Cantwell
  Ned Courtney
   Owen Madden
  Jack O'Reilly

Ireland (IFA) internationals
   Owen Madden

England internationals
  Raich Carter

Scotland internationals
  Jimmy Delaney

Other sports
  Noel Cantwell – played cricket for Ireland
  Ned Courtney – played Gaelic football for Cork

Notable former managers
  Owen Madden
 Raich Carter
 Jimmy Delaney

See also
League of Ireland in Cork city

References

Association football clubs established in 1948
Association football clubs disestablished in 1957
Association football clubs in County Cork
Defunct League of Ireland clubs
1948 establishments in Ireland
1957 disestablishments in Ireland
Association football clubs in Cork (city)